An upcoming American drama film based on the novel Erasure by Percival Everett is being directed and written by Cord Jefferson (in his feature directorial debut). The film stars Jeffrey Wright, Tracee Ellis Ross, Erika Alexander, Leslie Uggams, Sterling K. Brown, Myra Lucretia Taylor, John Ortiz, Issa Rae, and Adam Brody.

Cast and characters
 Jeffrey Wright as Thelonious “Monk” Ellison, an English professor and author who writes a satirical novel under a pseudonym
 Tracee Ellis Ross as Lisa, Monk’s older sister
 Erika Alexander as Coraline
 Leslie Uggams as Agnes, Monk’s mother with Alzheimer's disease
 Sterling K. Brown as Cliff 
 Myra Lucretia Taylor as Lorraine, Agnes' caretaker
 John Ortiz as Arthur
 Issa Rae as Sintara
 Adam Brody as Wiley

Production
On November 10, 2022, it was reported that Jeffrey Wright was cast in the untitled film based on the novel Erasure by Percival Everett written and directed by Cord Jefferson. T-Street Productions and MRC Film are producing the film. On December 2, 2022, it was announced that Tracee Ellis Ross will also star in film with Erika Alexander, Leslie Uggams, Sterling K. Brown, Myra Lucretia Taylor, John Ortiz, Issa Rae, and Adam Brody are round-out the cast. The film wrapped production in Boston in early December. Orion Pictures has acquired worldwide distribution rights to film.

References

External links

Upcoming films
Upcoming English-language films
Films shot in Boston
Upcoming directorial debut films
Orion Pictures films
Metro-Goldwyn-Mayer films